Having a Ball is an album by trombonist Al Grey released in 1963 on the Argo label.

Track listing
All compositions by Al Grey except where noted
 "Deep Fried" – 3:45
 "One Day I'll Show You" (Maurice McAllister) – 5:30
 "Something's Got a Hold on Me" (Etta James, Leroy Kirkland, Pearl Woods) – 5:15
 "I Don't Want To Cry" (Chuck Jackson, Luther Dixon) – 3:05
 "Stand By Me" (Ben E. King, Elmo Glick) – 3:50
 "Boss Tina" – 4:45
 "Rinky Dink" (David Clowney, Paul Winley) – 3:45
 "Stone Crazy" – 5:15

Personnel 
Al Grey – trombone
David Burns – trumpet
Bobby Hutcherson – vibraphone (tracks 1, 3–6 & 9)
Calvin Newborn – guitar
Hugh Lawson – piano 
Herman Wright – bass 
Otis Finch – drums

References

1963 albums
Al Grey albums
Argo Records albums
Albums produced by Esmond Edwards
Albums recorded at Van Gelder Studio